Roger Pipoz (1 January 1905 – 26 May 1956) was a Swiss racing cyclist. He rode in the 1931 Tour de France.

References

1905 births
1956 deaths
Swiss male cyclists
Place of birth missing